KEQX (89.5 FM, "Pure Country") is a noncommercial radio station licensed to Stephenville, Texas, United States, broadcasting a classic country music format. The station is currently owned by CSSI Non-Profit Educational Broadcasting Corporation. The station is one of the five stations in the "QXFM" GROUP of North Texas stations, including KMQX, KYQX, KQXB, and KQXE.  All the stations are funded by listener contributions, underwriting sponsors.

References

External links
 

EQX
Classic country radio stations in the United States
Radio stations established in 2006
2006 establishments in Texas